Basti Mundhe is a village in the Punjab of Pakistan.

Villages in Layyah District